The Metalliferous Mines Regulations, 1961 replaces both the Metalliferous Mines Regulations, 1926 and the Mysore Gold Mines Regulations, 1953 to prevent possible dangers, accidents and deaths from mining in India.

Important Regulations
9: Notice of Accident.

10: Notice of disease

60, 61, 63, & 64: Mine plans and Sections

106 to 118: Method of working in mines

119 to 130: Danger from fire, dust gas and water

146, 148:  Standards of lighting in the mines

153 to 170: Use of explosive in mines

References

See also
 Coal Mines Regulation Act 1908
 List of Statutory Instruments of the United Kingdom, 1962

Mining law and governance
Mine safety
Occupational safety and health organizations
Safety engineering
Indian legislation
1961 in India
Mining in India